Fox Glacier Hotel is a hotel in Fox Glacier, on the West Coast of New Zealand's South Island. Completed in 1928 for the Sullivan brothers, the building was granted historic place category 2 status by Heritage New Zealand in 1989.

Context
In the 1920s, a concerted effort was made to promote the West Coast, and the glacier region in particular, as a tourist destination. At Fox Glacier village, then known as Weheka, the Sullivan family had used their farm homestead as tourist accommodation, but increased demand saw the Sullivan brothers, Mick and John, decide to construct a purpose-built hotel, and they established a sawmill to mill local rimu for the project.

Architecture
The hotel was built in 1928, at a cost of approximately £20,000, and was officially opened on 20 December 1928. Although a two-storey building, the hotel was described as have a bungalow style, owing to the generous upper-floor verandahs. The hotel was built with 40 bedrooms, designed to accommodate up to 100 guests, as well as four parlours and a large dining room for up to 70 diners. A large portico at the main entrance provided shelter for arriving and departing guests. Upholstery for the hotel was completed by Caliari and O'Connell of Hokitika, while the tiling, mantling and furnishing were completed by James Duncan Jr, assisted locally by Robert Emmett Clarke.

Alterations
A large addition was made to the southeastern rear of the main building in the early 1950s, and the main facade gained flanking extensions in the 1950s and 1960s. In 2007 and more recently, significant refurbishment has been carried out.

Current status
In 1989, Fox Glacier Hotel received historic place category 2 classification by the New Zealand Historic Places Trust (now Heritage New Zealand). The building remains in use as a hotel, restaurant, and bar.

Notes

References

 
 
 

1920s architecture in New Zealand
Hotels in New Zealand
Heritage New Zealand Category 2 historic places in the West Coast, New Zealand
Hotel buildings completed in 1928